Hannu Lepistö (sometimes spelled Hannu Lepistoe; born 17 May 1946) is a Finnish former ski jumping coach.

In 2010 he was awarded the Knight's Cross of the Polish Order of Polonia Restituta.

He retired on 3 March 2011.

Private life
Lepistö's residence is in Lahti, Finland.

Teams and ski jumpers trained by Lepistö
 1980–1985 Finland A-team
 1985–1992 Italy A-team
 1994–1998 Finland A-team
 2002–2004 Austria national team
 2004–2006 Italy A-team
 2006–2008 Poland A-team
 2009–2011 Adam Małysz

External links
 Lepistö's work as a coach
 Lepistö's life and biography
 Adam Małysz's former coaches (among Hannu Lepistö)

1946 births
Living people
Finnish ski jumping coaches
Knights of the Order of Polonia Restituta